The 1989 BYU Cougars football team represented Brigham Young University as a member of the Western Athletic Conference (WAC) during the 1989 NCAA Division I-A football season. Led by 18th-year head coach LaVell Edwards, the Cougars compiled a record of 10–3 overall and 7–1 in conference play, winning the WAC title. BYU was invited to the Holiday Bowl, where the Cougars lost to Penn State.

Schedule

Personnel

Season summary

at New Mexico

Washington State

at Navy

at Utah State

Wyoming

at Colorado State

UTEP

at Hawaii

Oregon

Air Force

Utah

at San Diego State

Holiday Bowl (vs Penn State)

References

BYU
BYU Cougars football seasons
Western Athletic Conference football champion seasons
BYU Cougars football